May refer to the following grand princes of Moscow:

 Vasily I of Moscow (1371–1425)
 Vasily II of Moscow (1415–1462)
 Vasily III of Moscow (1479–1533)